Sararanga is a genus of flowering plants in the family Pandanaceae, with two species that occur in the Philippines, northern part of New Guinea, the Bismarck Archipelago and Solomon Islands. They are palm-like dioecious trees and shrubs, often called palms, but not closely related to palm trees. The scientific name comes from the species of these plants named sararang in the Solomon Islands.

Species
Sararanga philippinensis Merr., Publ. Bur. Sci. Gov. Lab. 29: 5 (1905).
Sararanga sinuosa Hemsl., J. Linn. Soc., Bot. 30: 216 (1894).

References

External links
 Images Google

Pandanales genera
Pandanaceae